The 2014 Skate Canada Autumn Classic was a senior international figure skating competition in the 2014–15 season. A part of the 2014–15 ISU Challenger Series, the inaugural edition of the annual event was held on 15–16 October 2014 in Barrie, Canada. Medals were awarded in the disciplines of men's singles, ladies' singles, pair skating, and ice dancing.

Results

Men

Ladies

Pairs

Ice dancing

References

Skate Canada Autumn Classic, 2014
Autumn Classic International
Sport in Barrie